Dimitrios Peroulis is an American electrical engineer and educator. He is currently Reily Professor of Electrical and Computer Engineering and was named in  2019 Michael and Katherine Birck Head of Elmore Family School of Electrical and Computer Engineering at Purdue University College of Engineering. Peroulis was elected IEEE Fellow in 2017 for his "contributions to MEMS-based tunable filters". He received, together with Andrea Alu and Mona Jarrahi, 2014 IEEE MTT-S Outstanding Young Engineer Award for "outstanding early career contributions to the microwave profession”. In 2013, Peroulis was inducted into the Purdue Book of Great Teachers which "honors outstanding teaching faculty who have demonstrated sustained excellence in the classroom". He was the recipient of a 2008 A. A. Potter Best of Engineering Teaching award and a 2010 Charles B. Murphy award, Purdue's highest undergraduate teaching honor. 

Peroulis earned his M.S. and Ph.D. degrees from the University of Michigan. His undergraduate degree is from the National Technical University of Athens, Greece.

Peroulis is an inventor on 11 patents for reconfigurable RF systems and wireless sensor technologies.

Books 
 Electrical Engineering: Hands-on Learning (2012) Kendall Hunt Publishing Company, .
 First Designs in Electrical Engineering (2016) Kendall Hunt Publishing Company, .

References

External links

Purdue University faculty
Fellow Members of the IEEE
Living people
Year of birth missing (living people)
American electrical engineers